= Adidas Futsal Park =

Futsal venue in Tokyo, Japan

Coordinates: 35.65716°N 139.70323°E

Adidas Futsal Park (Japanese: アディダスフットサルパーク) is a futsal venue located in Tokyo, Japan.

== History ==
Adidas Futsal Park opened in 2001. It opened to commemorate the 2002 FIFA World Cup Japan would be co-hosting with South Korea. The pitch became Japan's first rooftop futsal court. The venue sits on top of the Tokyu Toyoko department store, next to the Shibuya Station. As a "rooftop urban soccer park", it is affiliated with Adidas Japan, and is equipped with shower rooms.

Adidas Futsal Park is inspired by the schoolyards of Japan and different tournaments for adults are organized there as well as futsal sessions for children. The venue is considered a "marvel of urban planning" as well as a unique futsal venue worldwide by local and foreign media.
